José Rodríguez (born 18 July 1967) is a Puerto Rican boxer. He competed in the men's flyweight event at the 1984 Summer Olympics.

References

1967 births
Living people
Puerto Rican male boxers
Olympic boxers of Puerto Rico
Boxers at the 1984 Summer Olympics
Place of birth missing (living people)
Flyweight boxers